Andrew Lavin ( – date of death unknown) was an Irish politician and farmer. He was elected unopposed as a Sinn Féin Teachta Dála (TD) to the 2nd Dáil at the 1921 elections for the Leitrim–Roscommon North constituency. He supported the Anglo-Irish Treaty and voted in favour of it. 

He was elected as a pro-Treaty Sinn Féin TD at the 1922 general election. He was elected as a Cumann na nGaedheal TD for Roscommon constituency at the 1923 general election. He lost his seat at the June 1927 general election, and was also an unsuccessful candidate at the September 1927 general election.

References

1890s births
Year of death missing
Early Sinn Féin TDs
Cumann na nGaedheal TDs
Members of the 2nd Dáil
Members of the 3rd Dáil
Members of the 4th Dáil
People of the Irish Civil War (Pro-Treaty side)
Irish farmers
Politicians from County Roscommon